Jaël (aka Jaël Malli; born Rahel Krebs; 19 August 1979 in Bern, Switzerland) is a Swiss musician who was the frontwoman and lead singer of the band Lunik from 1998 to 2013.

She worked several times with Delerium, co-writing, and singing "After All" on their album Chimera, "Lost and Found" on their album Nuages du Monde, and "Light Your Light" on their 2012 album Music Box Opera. She is both internationally famous in the trance music community as well as domestically famous from her work in Lunik. The origin of her pseudonym is that she had trouble pronouncing her real name correctly as a child.

Jaël also featured on DJ Tatana's 2004 single "Always on My Mind", which had moderate chart success in Switzerland upon its release. She can also be heard in two tracks ("You Remain" and "Stop Crying") on Mich Gerber's 2004 album Tales of the Wind and on the 2008 release Sehnsucht from Schiller on the track "Tired".

Collaborations
 Delerium
 "After All" on Chimera (2003; co-writing and vocals)
 "Lost and Found" on Nuages du Monde (2007; vocals)
 "Light Your Light" on Music Box Opera (2012; vocals)
 "Keep on Dreaming" on Mythologie (2016; vocals)
 DJ Tatana
 "Always on My Mind" (2004; vocals)
 Mich Gerber
 "You Remain" on Tales of the Wind (2004; vocals)
 "Stop Crying" on Tales of the Wind (2004; vocals)
 Schiller
 "Tired" on Sehnsucht (2008; vocals)

See also
Lunik

References

External links

1979 births
Living people
21st-century Swiss women singers
English-language singers from Switzerland
People from Bern
Swiss singer-songwriters